Anna Kendrick is an American actress and singer who has received a variety of accolades for her work in film, television and musical theater. For her first starring role in the Broadway musical High Society (1998), she earned a nomination for the Tony Award for Best Featured Actress in a Musical. For her performance in Jason Reitman's comedy-drama film Up in the Air (2009), she received nominations for the Golden Globe Award, the Screen Actors Guild Award, the Critics' Choice Movie Award, the British Academy Film Award, and the Academy Award for Best Supporting Actress.

Academy Awards

British Academy Film Awards

Critics' Choice Movie Awards

Empire Awards

Golden Globe Awards

Independent Spirit Awards

MTV Movie & TV Awards

Nickelodeon Kids' Choice Awards

People's Choice Awards

Primetime Emmy Awards

Satellite Awards

Screen Actors Guild Awards

Teen Choice Awards

Tony Awards

Critics associations

Notes

References

External links
 
 

Kendrick, Anna
Kendrick, Anna